Allyn Rose (born May 27, 1988) is an American beauty pageant titleholder, professional speaker, and breast cancer advocate from Newburg, Maryland.

Rose won the title of Miss Maryland USA 2011 title and represented Maryland in the Miss USA 2011 pageant in June 2011, placing in the top 8.  The following year she won the Miss District of Columbia title and competed in the Miss America 2013 pageant where she was unplaced.

After losing her mother to breast cancer at the age of 16, Rose partnered with the Susan G. Komen Breast Cancer Foundation and the Tigerlilly Foundation, educating women in cancer prevention.  In the fall of 2012, Rose revealed her decision to undergo a prophylactic double mastectomy. In June 2013, she gave a TED Talk at Chapman University on the Power of Redefining Breasts. Rose continues to work as a preventive healthcare advocate and contributor on several national media outlets. The 21st Annual Congress on Women's Health awarded her the Women's Health Advocacy Award.

Rose was a competitive roller figure skater and won her first USA Roller Sports (USARS) championship at the age of 12. She attended La Plata High School in La Plata, Maryland. Rose went on to play volleyball for the College of Southern Maryland and later at the University of Maryland, College Park, where she graduated with a B.A. in Government & Politics.  In 2017, Rose completed her M.A. in International Business Law at the  University of Mannheim.

References

External links
 Official website

1988 births
Living people
American beauty pageant winners
American women's volleyball players
Miss America 2013 delegates
Miss USA 2011 delegates
People from Charles County, Maryland
University of Maryland, College Park alumni
Miss Supranational contestants
Maryland Terrapins women's volleyball players